Thirteen Chairs may refer to:

 Thirteen Chairs (1938 film), German film
 Thirteen Chairs (1945 film), Swedish film starring Åke Söderblom
 The Thirteen Chairs, 1969 American film